The canton of Le Vigan is an administrative division of the Gard department, southern France. Its borders were modified at the French canton reorganisation which came into effect in March 2015. Its seat is in Le Vigan.

It consists of the following communes:
 
Alzon
Arphy
Arre
Arrigas
Aulas
Aumessas
Avèze
Bez-et-Esparon
Blandas
Bréau-Mars
La Cadière-et-Cambo
Campestre-et-Luc
Causse-Bégon
Conqueyrac
Dourbies
L'Estréchure
Lanuéjols
Lasalle
Mandagout
Molières-Cavaillac
Montdardier
Peyrolles
Les Plantiers
Pommiers
Pompignan
Revens
Rogues
Roquedur
Saint-André-de-Majencoules
Saint-André-de-Valborgne
Saint-Bresson
Saint-Hippolyte-du-Fort
Saint-Julien-de-la-Nef
Saint-Laurent-le-Minier
Saint-Martial
Saint-Roman-de-Codières
Saint-Sauveur-Camprieu
Saumane
Soudorgues
Sumène
Trèves
Val-d'Aigoual
Le Vigan
Vissec

References

Cantons of Gard